The 2020 season was Molde's 13th consecutive year in Eliteserien, and their 44th season in the top flight of Norwegian football. They finished second in the Eliteserien, whilst the Norwegian Cup and Mesterfinalen where cancelled due to the COVID-19 pandemic in Norway. In Europe, Molde where knocked out of the 2020–21 UEFA Champions League by Ferencváros dropping into the Europa League where they progressed to the Round of 32 which will take place in the 2021 season.

Season events
On 3 January, Tobias Hestad extended his contract with Molde until the end of 2022.

On 31 January, Molde announced that Etzaz Hussain had signed a new contract with the club, until the end of the 2022 season.

On 11 February, Molde announced the signing of Marcus Holmgren Pedersen on a three-year contract from Tromsø.

On 9 March, Molde cancelled their planned training camp in Marbella, Spain due to the COVID-19 pandemic.

The season was scheduled to begin on 4 April, but due to the COVID-19 pandemic in Norway the opening games of the season were delayed, first till 2 May, then further delayed till 23 May.

On 4 May, Molde announced the singing of Ola Brynhildsen from Stabæk on a 2 ½ year agreement commencing on 1 July.

On 7 May, the Norwegian government allowed the league to start on 16 June with full training starting immediately.

On 20 May, Ola Brynhildsen's transfer from Stabæk to Molde was concluded.

On 28 May, Molde announced that Vegard Forren would leave the club by mutual agreement on 31 May, after Forren used money gathered from players fines to cover gambling debts.

On 12 June, the Norwegian Football Federation announced that a maximum of 200 home fans would be allowed to attend the upcoming seasons matches.

On 15 June, Molde announced that Kristoffer Haugen had signed a new contract, until the end of the 2022 season.

On 17 June, Molde announced the singing of Albert Braut Tjåland from Bryne and Anton Solbakken from Viking, with the deals becoming official on 1 July.

On 27 June, Molde announced that Erling Moe had signed a new two-year contract with the club, keeping him as manager until the end of the 2022 season.

On 30 June, Molde announced the signing of Sheriff Sinyan on a three-year contract from Lillestrøm.

On 10 September, the Norwegian Football Federation cancelled the 2020 Norwegian Cup due to the COVID-19 pandemic in Norway.

On 30 September, the Minister of Culture and Gender Equality, Abid Raja, announced that clubs would be able to have crowds of 600 at games from 12 October.

On 6 October, Molde announced the signing of Birk Risa from Odd on a contract until 2023, with John Kitolano moving in the opposite direction on loan from his parent club Wolverhampton Wanderers.

Squad

Transfers

In

Loans in

Out

Loans out

Released

Friendlies

Competitions

Eliteserien

Results summary

Results by match

Results

Table

Norwegian Cup

Champions League

Qualifying rounds

Europa League

Group stage

Squad statistics

Appearances and goals

|-
|colspan="14"|Players away from Molde on loan:
|-
|colspan="14"|Players who appeared for Molde no longer at the club:

|}

Goal scorers

Clean sheets

Disciplinary record

See also
Molde FK seasons

References

2020
Molde
Molde